Rookies in Burma is a 1943 American comedy film directed by Leslie Goodwins from an original screenplay by Edward James. Produced and distributed by RKO Radio Pictures, it was released on December 7, 1943, being a sequel to the earlier 1943 film, Adventures of a Rookie.

Bert Gilroy, who had been a producer at RKO since 1938, would leave the studio after completing this film.  He would produce only one other film in his career, Hollywood Bound, in 1946 for Astor Pictures. This would also mark the last film in which the actor Erford Gage would perform. After it wrapped, Gage reported for duty in the US Army.  He would die in March 1945 in the Philippines, as a result of wounds suffered in action.

As in the earlier film, this picture stars the comedy duo of Wally Brown and Alan Carney.

Plot
While stationed in Burma, buck privates Jerry Miles and Mike Strager are assigned to kitchen duty when they end up captured and taken to a prisoner-of-war camp with other soldiers, including Sgt. Burke, a man they know well.

The three escape and encounter two stranded American women, Connie and Janie, along the way. A clever ruse causes a company of Japanese soldiers pursuing them to plunge off a cliff. An elephant helps enable the five to get back to safety, although not before a Japanese tank begins firing at them. Everyone ends up safe and sound, although Jerry and Mike end up right back where they began, peeling potatoes.

Cast
 Wally Brown as Jerry
 Alan Carney as Mike 
 Erford Gage as Sgt. Burke
 Joan Barclay as Connie
 Claire Carleton as Janie
 Ted Hecht as Tomura

References

External links

1943 films
1943 comedy films
American black-and-white films
American comedy films
Military humor in film
RKO Pictures films
World War II films made in wartime
Burma Campaign films
Films produced by Bert Gilroy
Films directed by Leslie Goodwins